AmpleBosom.com is a UK based online and mail order  bra, lingerie, swimwear, nightwear and clothing retailer founded in 1999 by Sally Robinson, based on a family run farm in Old Byland, North Yorkshire. AmpleBosom.com featured on the BBC series Inside Dot Coms in 2000.

Headquarters

AmpleBosom.com is based in converted barns  at Valley View Farm, Old Byland, Helmsley, North Yorkshire.

Products 

AmpleBosom.com products include  bras, lingerie, swimwear, nightwear and clothing for women and menswear briefs. The bra sized products range from 28 to 58 AA-N cups and the company specialises in plus sizes.

References

Online retailers of the United Kingdom
Underwear brands
Companies based in Ryedale
Clothing companies established in 1999
Retail companies established in 1999
Internet properties established in 1999
1999 establishments in England
Clothing retailers of England
Clothing companies of England
Clothing brands of the United Kingdom